The 1987–88 Scottish Cup was the 103rd staging of Scotland's most prestigious football knockout competition. The Cup was won by Celtic who defeated Dundee United in the final.

First round

Replays

Second round

Replay

Second Replay

Third round

Replays

Fourth round

Replays

Quarter-finals

Replay

Second Replay

Semi-finals

Replay

Second Replay

Final

See also
1987–88 in Scottish football
1987–88 Scottish League Cup

Scottish Cup seasons
Scottish Cup, 1987-88
Scot